Oltean is a Romanian-language surname. Notable people with the surname include:

Daniela Oltean, Romanian speed skater
Mircea Oltean, Romanian footballer
Ioan Oltean, Romanian lawyer and politician
Sergiu Oltean, Romanian footballer

See also
Olteanu

Romanian-language surnames